Ureaplasma cati is a species of Ureaplasma, a genus of bacteria belonging to the family Mycoplasmataceae. It has been isolated from cats. Its sequence accession no. (16S rRNA gene) for the type strain: D78649.

References

cati